Frobert of Troyes, or Frodobert (born in the beginning of the 7th century in Troyes, died 31 January 673 at Saint-André-les-Vergers), was a churchmen and abbot of the Saint-Pierre de Montier-la-Celle Abbey near Saint-André-les-Vergers, an abbey he founded in the middle of the 7th century on part of a royal domain granted him by Clovis II. He began building in 660, and dedicated the church to Saint Peter. He is recognized as a saint by the Catholic church and the Orthodox Church. A hagiography was written by Adso of Montier-en-Der.

References

External links
Saint Frobert, from the Roman Martyrology

French abbots
Canons (priests)
673 deaths
7th-century French priests
French Roman Catholic saints
French theologians
Colombanian saints